Hydraulic power may refer to:

 Hydropower, power derived from the energy of falling or fast running water
Fluid power,  use of fluids under pressure to generate, control, and transmit power
 Power supplied via a Hydraulic power network, using pressurised water.
Erosive work done by hydraulic action of the sea or other water source.